Bastiaan Jan "Bas Jan" van Bochove (born 3 October 1950) is a Dutch politician and former educator serving as Acting Mayor of Weesp since 2014. A member of the Christian Democratic Appeal (CDA), he was a member of the House of Representatives from 2002 to 2012 with a brief interruption in 2010. As a parliamentarian, he focused on matters of housing, Kingdom relations and education.

Biography
Elected to the municipal council of Lelystad in 1982, Van Bochove presided over the party group from 1985 until 1990, when he was appointed as an alderman, a position he retained until 2002. After the 2010 general election, in which the Christian Democrats lost 20 seats, he lost his position as a member of the House of Representatives. He regained it in the following months, after parliamentarians resigned to join the First Rutte cabinet. In 2012, he left the House of Representatives. Since 2014, Van Bochove has been Acting Mayor of Weesp.

References 
  Parlement.com biography

1950 births
Living people
Aldermen in Flevoland
People from Lelystad
Christian Democratic Appeal politicians
Dutch educators
Mayors in North Holland
People from Weesp
Protestant Church Christians from the Netherlands
Members of the House of Representatives (Netherlands)
People from Ermelo, Netherlands
21st-century Dutch politicians